The 1996 Indian general election polls in Tamil Nadu were held for 39 seats in the state. The result was a landslide for the newly formed alliance between Dravida Munnetra Kazhagam (DMK), Tamil Maanila Congress (TMC) and its leader G. K. Moopanar, and the left parties who ended up getting all 39 seats. Post election, the newly formed United Front, ended up getting all the seats from Tamil Nadu, since DMK and TMC joined it, with outside support from Indian National Congress (INC). The results in Tamil Nadu is a reflection of the results nationally, where INC, ended up losing the most seats.  This election was seen as redemption for Moopanar and TMC, since they left Congress, on grounds that they formed an alliance with AIADMK, even though J. Jayalalithaa, general secretary of AIADMK, was accused of many corruption charges. This led to a disastrous showing, for AIADMK and Congress in Tamil Nadu, since they lost all 39 seats from the last election, and TMC reaping the benefits by getting the most seats, in this election with 20 seats.

Seat allotments

Congress Front

United Front

MDMK-CPI(M) Front

PMK-Tiwari Congress Front

Voting and results

Results by alliance

|-
! style="background-color:#E9E9E9;text-align:left;vertical-align:top;" |Alliance/Party
!style="width:4px" |
! style="background-color:#E9E9E9;text-align:right;" |Seats won
! style="background-color:#E9E9E9;text-align:right;" |Change
! style="background-color:#E9E9E9;text-align:right;" |Popular vote
! style="background-color:#E9E9E9;text-align:right;" |Vote %
! style="background-color:#E9E9E9;text-align:right;" |Adj. %‡
|-
! style="background-color:#FF0000; color:white"|United Front
! style="background-color: " |
| 39
| +33
| 14,940,474
| colspan=2 style="text-align:center;vertical-align:middle;"| 55.0%
|-
|TMC(M)
! style="background-color: #008080" |
| 20
| +14
| 7,339,982
| 27.0%
| 54.6%
|-
|DMK
! style="background-color: Red" |
| 17
| +17
| 6,967,679
| 25.6%
| 56.2%
|-
|CPI
! style="background-color: #0000FF" |
| 2
| +2
| 632,813
| 2.3%
| 43.1%
|-
! style="background-color:#009900; color:white"|Congress alliance
! style="background-color: " |
| 0
| -33
| 7,095,650
| colspan=2 style="text-align:center;vertical-align:middle;"| 26.1%
|-
|INC
! style="background-color: " |
| 0
| -22
| 4,965,364
| 18.3%
| 
|-
|AIADMK
! style="background-color: " | 
| 0
| -11
| 2,130,286
| 7.8%
| 29.4%
|-
! style="background-color:Black; color:white"|MDMK+ alliance
! style="background-color: Black" |
| 0
| –
| 2,131,618
| colspan=2 style="text-align:center;vertical-align:middle;"|7.8%
|-
|MDMK
! style="background-color: " |
| 0
| –
| 1,222,415
| 4.5%
| 7.2%
|-
|CPI(M)
! style="background-color: " |
| 0
| –
| 493,916
| 1.8%
| 
|-
|JD
! style="background-color: " |
| 0
| –
| 415,287
| 1.5%
| 
|-
! style="background-color:Purple; color:white"|PMK+ alliance
! style="background-color: Purple" |
| 0
| –
| 1,157,683
| colspan=2 style="text-align:center;vertical-align:middle;"|4.3%
|-
|AIIC(T)
! style="background-color: " |
| 0
| –
| 605,565
| 2.2%
| 
|-
|PMK
! style="background-color: " |
| 0
| –
| 552,118
| 2.0%
| 5.2%
|-
! style="background-color:Gray; color:white"|Others
! style="background-color: Gray" |
| 0
| –
| 1,863,516
| colspan=2 style="text-align:center;vertical-align:middle;"|6.9%
|-
|BJP
! style="background-color: " |
| 0
| –
| 795,797
| 2.9%
| 
|-
|JP
! style="background-color: " |
| 0
| –
| 205,816
| 0.8%
| 
|-
|IND
! style="background-color: " |
| 0
| –
| 815,224
| 3.0%
| 
|-
| style="text-align:center;" |Total
! style="background-color: " |
| 39
| –
| 27,188,941
| 100%
| –
|-
|}
Note: TMC(M) is a spliter-group of INC, who carried with them 6 incumbent MPs from previous election
‡: Vote % reflects the percentage of votes the party received compared to the entire electorate that voted in this election. Adjusted (Adj.) Vote %, reflects the average % of votes the party received per constituency that they contested.
Sources: Election Commission of India

List of Elected MPs

c-indicates sitting/incumbent M.P. from previous Lok Sabha (1991–1996)

Post-election Union Council of Ministers from Tamil Nadu
Source: Thinkquest Library

Cabinet Ministers

Ministers of State

See also 
 Elections in Tamil Nadu

References

External links
 Website of Election Commission of India
 CNN-IBN Lok Sabha Election History

1996 Indian general election
Indian general elections in Tamil Nadu
1990s in Tamil Nadu